The 1922 Locomotive Cyclopedia of American Practice, published by Simmons-Boardman, is the most recent Locomotive Cyclopedia to be in the public domain.  At 1141 pages of main text, plus indices, front matter, and other content, it is a substantially sized book.  It is basically a combined catalog for all the major builders of railroad locomotives and associated equipment in North America.  It contains photographs and scale drawings of several hundred locomotive types as examples of the locomotives that North American builders can produce, as well as chapters on all manner of locomotive components, appliances and equipment, with material provided by the major builders of such.

Picture gallery
Illustrations from the 1922 Locomotive Cyclopedia

References

Reference works in the public domain
Specialized encyclopedias